Darželiai (Varėna) is a village in Varėna district municipality, in Alytus County, in southeastern Lithuania. According to the 2001 census, the village has a population of 61 people.

Darželiai village is located c.  from Druskininkai,  from Varėna,  from Kapiniškiai (the nearest settlement).

References

Villages in Alytus County
Varėna District Municipality